Erebus illodes is a moth of the family Erebidae. It is found in Indonesia (Java).

References

Moths described in 1916
Erebus (moth)